Elizabeth Aishat Anjorin  is a Nigerian female actor and movie producer, predominantly in the Nigerian Yoruba movie industry.

Early life and education
Anjorin was born in Badagry in Lagos State, in the predominantly Yoruba southwestern geographical area of Nigeria. Her father was Christian and her mother Muslim. She has said that she grew up in poverty with her mother, was once a food seller, and was driven to succeed by the fear of again being poor. She entered Olabisi Onabanjo University in 2003, where she was a student activist, and graduated in 2017 with a BSc in Transport Planning and Management after leaving to pursue acting. She then took acting classes, at which time she met Idowu Ogungbe and Ahmed Alasari, who helped her with her career.

Career
As an actress, Anjorin came to prominence at the end of the first decade of the 21st century; films she is known for include Ise Onise and Arewa Ejo in 2009 and Owowunmi in 2010.

Anjorin now produces the films in which she appears. Her first self-produced movie was Tolani Gbarada. Others include Gold, on her own life, Iyawo Abuke, the 2012 comedy Kofo Tinubu, Kofo De First Lady, and Owo Naira Bet, reportedly the most expensive Yoruba film up to that time. It premiered in 2017 and was released in 2018. She is one of the wealthiest actors in Nigeria.

She is also a fashion designer and sells clothes and accessories.

Awards
Anjorin won the Best Actress Award at the Young Achievers Awards in 2012 for Kofo Tinubu, and the City Pride Achievers Award for Best Actress in 2013 and 2014, the second time also for Kofo Tinubu. At the 2014 City People Entertainment Awards, she was nominated for Best Actress of the Year (Yoruba) and was awarded Yoruba Movie Personality of the Year. At the 2017 City People Entertainment Awards, she won Yoruba Movie Personality of the Year (Female) and a Special Recognition Award for Owo Naira Bet.

Personal life
Anjorin is a single parent. She converted from Christianity to Islam and adopted the name Aishat.

In September 2019, she was involved in a feud on social media with Toyin Abraham. She accused Abraham of falsely accusing her of trafficking cocaine, leading to her being searched at an airport, and of having her baby at a traditional healer's establishment rather than a hospital and concealing it. Both women threatened lawsuits, and Anjorin accused Abraham of herself using cocaine and asked the National Drug Law Enforcement Agency to test them both for drugs. The feud was ended by Bolaji Amusan, president of the Theatre Arts and Movie Practitioners Association of Nigeria.

Selected filmography
Ise Onise (2009)
Arewa Ejo (2009)
Owowunmi (2010)
Tolani Gbarada
Gold
Iyawo Abuke
Kofo De First Lady
Kofo Tinubu (2012)
Owo Naira Bet (2017)

See also
 List of Yoruba people
 List of Nigerian actresses

References

External links

Living people
Nigerian film actresses
21st-century Nigerian actresses
Yoruba actresses
People from Lagos State
Converts to Islam from Christianity
Nigerian Muslims
Nigerian former Christians
Actresses in Yoruba cinema
Olabisi Onabanjo University alumni
20th-century births
Year of birth missing (living people)